The Amherst Political Union (APU) is a student debating club at Amherst College.  Founded in 1939 by Robert Morgenthau '41 and Richard Wilbur '42 and re-founded in the spring of 2010, the club aims to bring speakers on contemporary political thought to Amherst in a nonpartisan and unbiased manner.

Mission statement
The Amherst Political Union prides itself on its nonpartisan structure and serves as an environment of engagement for individuals with varied political views. Since its founding, the Political Union has sought to fight the political apathy that plagues many other colleges by engaging members of the Amherst College campus in productive conversations relating to salient and pressing political issues.

Notable Recent Speakers Include
Prime Minister of Pakistan Shaukat Aziz
Former RNC Chairman Michael Steele
Harvard Law Professor Lawrence Lessig
Senator George Mitchell
Journalist Mona Eltahawy
Former Presidential Candidate Ralph Nader
Former CIA Director John Deutch
Congressman Jamie Raskin
Congressman Tom Davis
Libertarian Doug Bandow

Other historic collegiate debating organizations
 The Berkeley Forum of University of California, Berkeley
 The Philomathean Society of the University of Pennsylvania
 The Philolexian Society of Columbia University
 The American Whig-Cliosophic Society of Princeton University
 The Jefferson Literary and Debating Society of the University of Virginia
 The Union-Philanthropic (Literary) Society of Hampden-Sydney College
 The Dialectic and Philanthropic Societies of the University of North Carolina at Chapel Hill
 The Demosthenian Literary Society of The University of Georgia in Athens
 The Euphradian Society of University of South Carolina
 The Yale Political Union of Yale University
 The Philodemic Society of Georgetown University

References

External links
Amherst Political Union Facebook Page

Amherst College
Student debating societies
Youth organizations based in Massachusetts